NuAngels, also known by their former name neAngely (Ukrainian & Russian: неАнгелы), is a Ukrainian duo that was formed in 2006 by Ukrainian producer Yuriy Nikitin. The duo is made up of Oksana Kuznyetsova, known as "Slava" (Ukrainian & Russian: Слава) and Ekaterina Smeyukha, known as "Viktoriya". They perform in Russian and English.

Career
The group attempted to represent Ukraine in the Eurovision Song Contest 2014 with their song "Courageous". They tied for fifth place in the Ukrainian national selection with two other competitors, earning fourth place from the jury and sixth place from the televoting. They took part in the Ukrainian national final for the Eurovision Song Contest 2016 with the song "Higher", reaching 5th overall.

Members

Slava
Oksana "Slava" Kuznyetsova was born  in Odessa. Before the duo became a party involved in the project "People's Artist" and the reality show Temptation Island in 2005. She studied at the Kyiv National University of Culture and Arts with a vocal coach. She is a coloratura contralto and got married in 2012.

Viktoriya 
Ekaterina "Viktoriya" Smeyukha was born  in Kharkiv. She took part in the TV show Chance and before meeting Yuri Nikitin, Viktoriya performed solo under the name Kyra. Viktoriya started her singing career as a member of the group SMS. However, the producer of the group was later convinced that she needed to pursue a solo career. She is a deep contralto and can play the piano. Viktoriya began to study at the Kharkiv State Academy of Culture, but two years later transferred to the Kyiv National University of Culture and Arts.

Discography

Albums
Russian studio albums
  (2006)
  (2013)

Compilations
  (2015)

References

External links
Fansite of NeAngely

Ukrainian girl groups
Russian-language singers
English-language singers from Ukraine
Musical groups established in 2006
2006 establishments in Ukraine
Ukrainian musical groups
Female musical duos
Pop music duos